Das Schwarze Einmaleins is the ninth studio album by German medieval metal group Saltatio Mortis.

Track listing

Charts

References 

2013 albums
Saltatio Mortis albums